Racine Lock and Dam is the ninth lock and dam on the Ohio River. It is located 238 miles downstream from Pittsburgh. There are two locks, one for commercial barge traffic 1,200 feet long by 110 feet wide, and the auxiliary lock, which is 600 feet long by 110 feet wide.

See also
 List of locks and dams of the Ohio River
 List of locks and dams of the Upper Mississippi River

References

External links
U.S. Army Corps of Engineers, Pittsburgh District
U.S. Army Corps of Engineers, Huntington District
U.S. Army Corps of Engineers, Louisville District

Dams on the Ohio River
Dams in Ohio
Dams in West Virginia
Dams completed in 1971
Locks of Ohio
Locks of West Virginia
American Electric Power